Javier Moreno Luzón (born 1967) is a Spanish historian, professor of the History of Thought and Social and Political Movements at the Complutense University of Madrid. He is an expert in the political history of Restoration Spain.

Biography 
Born in 1967 in Hellín, province of Albacete. He earned a PhD in history from the Complutense University of Madrid (UCM) reading a dissertation in 1996 titled El conde de Romanones. Caciquismo y política de clientelas en la España de la Restauración and supervised by Santos Juliá. He has been a scholar and researcher at the National University of Distance Education (UNED), Harvard University, the École des Hautes Études en Sciences Sociales and the London School of Economics and Political Science. He also served as deputy director of the Centro de Estudios Políticos y Constitucionales (CEPC). A senior lecturer at the UCM since 1997, Moreno Luzón was appointed to a Chair of History of Thought and Social and Political Movements in 2012.

Works 

 Author
 
 

 Coauthor
 
 
 

 Coordinator/editor

References 
 Citations

 Bibliography
 
 
 
 
 
 
 
 
 
 
 
 
 
 
 
 

Academic staff of the Complutense University of Madrid
1967 births
Living people
20th-century Spanish historians
21st-century Spanish historians
Historians of the Bourbon Restoration in Spain
People from Hellín